Grigory Irmovich Novak (5 March 1919 – 10 July 1980) was a Jewish Soviet weightlifter who won a world title in 1946 and a silver medal at the 1952 Summer Olympics. During his career Novak set more than 50 world records, but only 18 became official: 14 in the press and 4 in the snatch.

As a child he worked in building construction alongside his father, and between 1933 and 1938 was an acrobat and juggler at a circus. In 1937, after the family moved to Kiev, Grigory seriously decided to go in for sports and enrolled in the wrestling section of the Dynamo society. He then started training in wrestling and weightlifting and finished second at the Soviet Weightlifting Championships in 1939. He won the national title in various weight categories in 1940, 1943, 1944–1946, 1948–49 and 1951.

After the 1952 Olympics, Novak retired from competitions and returned to the circus, where he worked as a strongman, weight juggler and choreographer till his death at the age of 61. He juggled with 30–40 kg weights, and his trademark feats included lifting large platforms on which several people were performing various activities, such as acrobatics, cycling and weightlifting. His two sons, Arkady and Roman, were also strongmen and acrobats, and they performed in the circus alongside his father.

Novak died of a heart attack while preparing his part of the 1980 Olympic entertainment program.

References

External links

1919 births
1980 deaths
People from Chornobyl
People from Radomyslsky Uyezd
Jewish Ukrainian sportspeople
Soviet Jews
Soviet male weightlifters
Jewish weightlifters
Olympic weightlifters of the Soviet Union
Weightlifters at the 1952 Summer Olympics
Olympic silver medalists for the Soviet Union
Olympic medalists in weightlifting
Medalists at the 1952 Summer Olympics
Acrobats
Circus strongmen and strongwomen
Jugglers
People associated with physical culture
European Weightlifting Championships medalists
World Weightlifting Championships medalists
Honored Artists of the RSFSR
Honoured Masters of Sport of the USSR
International Jewish Sports Hall of Fame inductees
Sportspeople from Kyiv Oblast